Aijaz Hussain Jakhrani (born 5 March 1967) is a Pakistani politician who had been a member of the National Assembly of Pakistan, from 2002 to May 2018. He is  associated with the Pakistan Peoples Party (PPP) from the Constituency of Jacobabad of the 14th Assembly.

From 2018 onwards he became advisor to Chief Minister Sindh which is equivalent to Minister. 

Currently he has portfolio of Prison and INter Provincal Coordination

Early life and education
He was born on 5 March 1967. He earned a bachelor's degree from University of Sindh in 1984.

Political career

He was elected to the National Assembly of Pakistan as a candidate of Pakistan Peoples Party (PPP) from Constituency NA-208 (Jacobabad-I) in 2002 Pakistani general election. He received 40,147 votes and defeated Elahi Bux Soomro.

He was re-elected to the National Assembly as a candidate of PPP from Constituency NA-208 (Jacobabad) in 2008 Pakistani general election. He received 52,813 votes and defeated Fahad Malik, a candidate of Pakistan Muslim League (Q) (PML-Q).

In November 2008, he was inducted into the federal cabinet of Prime Minister Yousaf Raza Gillani and was appointed as Federal Minister for Health where he served until December 2009. In December 2009, he was made Federal Minister for Sports where he continued to serve until February 2011.

He was re-elected to the National Assembly as a candidate of PPP from Constituency NA-208 (Jacobabad) in 2013 Pakistani general election. He received 51,025 votes and defeated Elahi Bux Soomro.

Controversy 
National Accountability Bureau (NAB) arrested close aide to Jakhrani, Jakhrani, Adviser to Chief Minister Sindh on Prisons, Zaheer, in Islamabad on allegation of owning assets more than his means.

References

Living people
Pakistan People's Party politicians
Sindhi people
Pakistani MNAs 2013–2018
People from Sindh
Place of birth missing (living people)
1967 births
Pakistani MNAs 2008–2013
Pakistani MNAs 2002–2007
People from Jacobabad District